The Traralgon Classic was a golf tournament in Australia. It was an event on the PGA Tour of Australia from 1978 to 1981. The event was held at Traralgon Golf Club in Traralgon, Victoria.

Among Greg Norman's earliest victories were at the event. One of the more notable performances was Paul Foley's 1980 win. Foley, who started the final round several shots back at even par, shot an extraordinary final round of 62, 10-under-par. He beat the course record by two and defeated Wayne Grady by six shots.

Winners

 1976 Frank Phillips (36 hole pro-am)

References 

Former PGA Tour of Australasia events
Golf tournaments in Australia
Golf in Victoria (Australia)